The Iceland national football team (in ) represents Iceland in men's international football. The team is controlled by the Football Association of Iceland, and have been a FIFA member since 1947 and an UEFA member since 1957. The team's nickname is Strákarnir okkar, which means Our Boys in Icelandic.

The team has enjoyed success in the second half of the 2010s. In the qualifying rounds for the 2014 FIFA World Cup, Iceland reached the playoffs before losing to Croatia. Iceland reached its first major tournament, UEFA Euro 2016, after a qualification campaign which included home and away wins over the Netherlands. After advancing to the knockout stages of Euro 2016, Iceland defeated England in the Round of 16, advancing to the quarter-finals, where they lost to host nation France 5–2. They became the smallest nation by population to ever clinch a FIFA World Cup berth when they qualified for the 2018 tournament on 9 October 2017. They drew with Argentina in their opening match, but nonetheless still went out in the group stage.

History

20th century
Although Úrvalsdeild, the Icelandic Football League, was founded in 1912, the country's first international match was played on 29 July 1930, against the Faroe Islands. Although Iceland won 1–0 away, both teams were at the time unaffiliated with FIFA. The first match officially recognised by FIFA took place in Reykjavík on 17 July 1946, a 0–3 loss to their future rivals Denmark. The first international victory was against Finland in 1947. For the first 20 years of the Football Association of Iceland (KSÍ)'s existence, the team mostly did not participate in qualifying for the FIFA World Cup or the UEFA European Championship. In 1954, Iceland applied to take part in qualification for the 1954 World Cup, but the application was rejected. In qualification for the 1958 World Cup, Iceland finished last in their group with zero wins, conceding 26 goals.

In 1980, Iceland won the first edition of the friendly tournament known as the Greenland Cup.

Since 1974, the team has taken part in qualifying for every World Cup and European Championship. In 1994, the team reached their then best ever position in the FIFA World Rankings, 37th. This record stood until 2016 when they managed to reach 21st. In a friendly against Estonia on 24 April 1996 in Tallinn, Eiður Smári Guðjohnsen entered as a substitute for his father Arnór. This marked the first time that a father and son played in the same international match.

21st century

In qualification for Euro 2004, Iceland finished third in their group, one point behind Scotland. As a result, they failed to qualify for a playoff spot.

However, the following qualifying campaigns will be much more difficult for Iceland which will flirt with the last places of its respective groups, in particular during the Euro 2008 qualifiers where despite two unexpected successes against Northern Ireland (3–0 in the opening away, 2–1 at home in the return) and a heroic resistance in the first and second leg against the Spanish future winners of the competition (a 1–1 draw at home after having led the score and a short 0–1 defeat away), Our boys suffered several other heavy defeats, including two against Latvia, who had qualified for Euro 2004 as a surprise (0–4 away, 2–4 home), and one against Liechtenstein (0–3 away, after a 1–1 home draw).

The reasons for the lack of results of the selection were due to the absence of professionals on the island, the Icelanders played soccer for fun. Moreover, the hostile climate where winter lasts 8 months did not help the development of the sport, there were only two synthetic fields forcing the footballers to train on the gravel or in the snow. In the 2000s, Icelandic soccer will experience a real revolution. The economic boom will allow the authorities to create important structures with indoor pitches in synthetic turf, which results in the practice of soccer all year round without worrying about the weather conditions outside. These new structures encourage young people to turn to sports and even lead to a decrease in alcohol and tobacco consumption among teenagers.

In 2014, Iceland almost secured qualification for their first World Cup. Finishing second in Group D, they played Croatia in a two-leg playoff for qualification. After holding them to a 0–0 draw in the home leg, they lost 2–0 away.

Euro 2016
Iceland qualified for a major tournament for the first time in 2015 after finishing second in Group A of qualification for Euro 2016, losing only two games, and beating the Netherlands – which had finished third in the 2014 World Cup – twice. During the qualification, they reached their then highest ranking in the FIFA World Rankings, 23rd. Iceland were drawn into a group with Portugal, Hungary and Austria for the final tournament.

At the tournament finals, Iceland recorded 1–1 draws in their first two group stage matches against Portugal and Hungary. They then advanced from their group with a 2–1 victory against Austria. Iceland qualified for the tournament's quarter-finals after a 2–1 upset win over England in the Round of 16, which led to England manager Roy Hodgson resigning in disgrace immediately after the final whistle. However, they were eliminated by host nation France in the quarter-finals, 5–2.

2018 World Cup
Iceland qualified for the 2018 World Cup, their first ever appearance in the world championship, securing qualification on 9 October 2017 after a 2–0 win against Kosovo. In doing so, they became the lowest-populated country ever to reach the finals. Iceland were drawn to play Croatia, Argentina and Nigeria in a group that was considered by many as the "group of death". Despite a challenging group, Iceland were tipped to advance from the group by several journalist websites, based on their impressive performance in Euro 2016. Their maiden match at the World Cup was against 2014 runners-up Argentina, with Iceland surprisingly holding Argentina to a 1–1 draw. However, their chances of advancing from the group were hurt following a 2–0 loss to Nigeria, with several missed opportunities in the first half and a penalty kick in the second half missed by Gylfi Sigurdsson, putting Iceland to play with full determination against already qualified Croatia. Iceland lost to Croatia in their final group game; and because Argentina won against Nigeria, Iceland finished bottom of the group with just a point.

2018–19 UEFA Nations League
After Euro 2016 and the 2018 World Cup, Iceland participated in the 2018–19 UEFA Nations League, in which they were in Group 2 of League A with Switzerland and Belgium. Many of Iceland's international matches in this competition were undermined by the repeated absence of some of their key players, often due to injury. Iceland lost all four games and faced relegation to League B, but due to a rule change by UEFA, Iceland was not relegated to League B for the 2020–2021 edition.

Euro 2020 qualifiers
In group H of the Euro qualifiers with the world champions France, Turkey, Albania, Andorra and Moldova. Iceland lost both confrontations against Les Bleus (4–0 at the Stade de France and 1–0 at home on a penalty kick after the hour of play at the end of a tight game) and the away match against Albania 4–2, though achieved a win and a draw against Turkey. Iceland finished third behind France and Turkey and advanced to the playoffs, where they defeated Romania 2–1. On 12 November 2020, in their playoff game against Hungary, Iceland nearly secured qualification for Euro 2020, having led 1–0 for most of the match, thanks to a direct free kick by Gylfi Sigurðsson. However, Hungary scored two goals in under five minutes, the first in the 88th minute by Loïc Nego and the second in the second minute of added time by Dominik Szoboszlai, proving to be the winner, thereby securing qualification at Iceland's expense.

Iceland had also suffered poor results in their UEFA Nations League campaign in League A, having lost all their group stage matches and failing to garner a single point, resulting in their relegation to League B the following season. Manager Erik Hamrén ultimately resigned, following their poor performance that year.

2022 World Cup qualifiers
Iceland also had a poor start to 2022 World Cup qualifiers, suffering two defeats at the beginning of the tournament, away against Germany (0–3) and Armenia (0–2). Preparation for the September games, where Iceland had the advantage of playing all three games at home after several away games and had played some encouraging friendlies in June, was disrupted by extra-sporting affairs involving both Kolbeinn Sigþórsson and Gylfi Sigurðsson accused of sexual offences and thus absent from the month's games. The cases also led to the resignation of several senior officials of the Icelandic Football Association, including its president. In the aftermath of these affairs, Iceland lost against Romania (0–2), drew against North Macedonia (2–2), and suffered a heavy loss against Germany (0–4); these results left Iceland in second-to-last place in Group J with four matches remaining. In the two October games, Iceland drew against Armenia (1–1) and defeated Liechtenstein (4–0). Despite these results, along with an away draw against Romania (0–0), Iceland was mathematically eliminated with one day remaining, being unable to recover enough points to reach second place.

This run of poor results has been attributed to several factors, both sporting and extra-sporting: the late generational renewal, a process partly hampered by a limited pool of footballers due to Iceland's demographics; the questionable tactical choices of the new coach, resulting in a lack of automatism among new players who are not used to playing together and the absence of a real standard team; and sexual assault scandals that have effectively sidelined some of the team's best players under investigation.

Team image

The national team uses a blue as the home colours and white as their second colours but their crest featuring stylized imagery of Iceland's four "guardian spirits" (Landvættir) in local folklore; a giant, a dragon, a bull, and an eagle. The team's crest was adopted in 2020 and was designed by Reykjavík-based firm Bradenburg. Previously the team used a team crest which features a shield-type symbol which consist the abbreviation of the Football Association of Iceland in Icelandic (KSI), strips which derives colors from the Flag of Iceland, and a football.

Iceland's supporters became known for using Viking Thunder Clap chant in the mid-2010s, which involves fans clapping their hands above their heads and yelling "huh!" to the beat of a drum; the tradition originates from Scottish club Motherwell F.C. Iceland's Viking Clap first received wider international attention during the Euro 2016.

Kit providers
The official kit is produced by German sports manufacturing company Puma since 2020. Before that the kit providers were Umbro (1975), Adidas (1976–1992), ABM (1992–1996), Reusch (1996–2001) and Erreà (2002–2020)

Results and fixtures

2022

2023

Coaching staff

Players

Current squad
The following players were called up for the UEFA Euro 2024 qualifying matches against Bosnia and Herzegovina and Liechtenstein on 23 March and 26 March 2023 respectively.

Caps and goals are correct as of 12 January 2023, after the match against Sweden.

Recent call-ups
The following players have been called up to the Iceland squad in the last 12 months.

INJ Withdrew due to injury
RET Retired from the national team
WD Player withdrew from the squad due to non-injury issue.
.

Previous squads

FIFA World Cup
World Cup 2018 squad

UEFA European Championship
Euro 2016 squad

Records
.
Players in bold are still active with Iceland.

Most caps

Top goalscorers

Competitive record

FIFA World Cup

UEFA European Championship

UEFA Nations League

Honours 
Baltic Cup
  Champions (1): 2022
 Greenland Cup
  Champions (2): 1980, 1984
 China Cup
  Runners-up (1): 2017

FIFA ranking history 
Source:

See also

Iceland national under-21 football team
Iceland national under-19 football team
Iceland national under-17 football team
Iceland national futsal team
Iceland women's national football team

Notes

References

External links

Football Association of Iceland
FIFA profile
Iceland National Team (1946–2000) by Jostein Nygård (Norway)
RSSSF archive of results 1946–
RSSSF archive of most capped players and highest goalscorers

 
European national association football teams
National Team